was a village located in Nishitsugaru District in western Aomori Prefecture, Japan. The village was situated on the west coast of Tsugaru Peninsula, facing the Sea of Japan.

History
The area was part of Hirosaki Domain during the Edo period. After the Meiji Restoration, Shariki Village was created in 1889. On 30 October 1889, the Cheseborough, an American merchant ship from Bath, Maine, wrecked a mile from the coast of the village. The villagers made a great effort to save the sailors, unfortunately nineteen of them did not survive the incident. After the remainder of the sailors recovered, they returned to the United States but maintained their relationship with the people of Shariki. This relationship eventually resulted in the village establishing a sister-city agreement with Bath, Maine.

On 11 February 2005, Shariki, along with the town of Kizukuri, and the villages of Inagaki, Kashiwa and Morita (all from Nishitsugaru District), was merged to create the city of Tsugaru, and thus no longer exists as an independent municipality, however, the city inherited Shariki's relationship with Bath.

At the time of its merger, Shariki had an estimated population of 5,730 and a population density of 92.16 persons per km2. The total area was 62.17 km2.  The village economy was dominated by agriculture and commercial fishing.

References

External links
 Official website of Tsugaru 
 Local business and sightseeing guide

Dissolved municipalities of Aomori Prefecture